Gheorghe Poenaru (born 1 November 1956) is a Romanian former footballer and manager. As a footballer, Poenaru played mainly as a midfielder for Divizia B and Divizia C teams such as Partizanul Bacău, Aripile Bacău or CSM Borzești, all clubs based in his home county, Bacău.

Poenaru retired in 1992, and started his manager career in 1990, as a player-manager at Aripile Bacău. Subsequently, he was one of the most important managers in the history of Petrolul Moinești, team which he promoted at the level of the second tier and maintained it there for next years. As a result, in 1999 he was promoted as manager of Divizia A club, FCM Bacău, club at which he spent most of his career as a manager. In the top-flight Poenaru also managed Ceahlăul Piatra Neamț and Jiul Petroșani; in the second tier FC Onești and Laminorul Roman. Jiul was the only team outside Moldavia that had Poenaru under contract.

Between 2014 and 2016, Poenaru was the technical director of SC Bacău. After SC Bacău relegation from Liga II, Poenaru retired from the manager career, also having some health problems related to the heart.

Honours

Player
 Partizanul Bacău
 Divizia D – Bacău County: Winner (1) 1973–74

 Aripile Bacău
 Divizia D – Bacău County: Winner (1) 1976–77
 Divizia C: Winner (2) 1984–85, 1987–88

 Borzești
 Divizia C: Winner (1) 1981–82

Manager
 Petroul Moinești
 Divizia C: Winner (1) 1995–96

References

External links
 
 
 Gheorghe Poenaru at labtof.ro

1956 births
Living people
People from Bacău County
Romanian footballers
Association football midfielders
Liga II players
CS Aerostar Bacău players
Romanian football managers
CS Aerostar Bacău managers
FCM Bacău managers
CSM Ceahlăul Piatra Neamț managers
CSM Jiul Petroșani managers